Virginia Cox Balmaceda (29 August 1905 – 2 October 2002) was a Chilean journalist and writer of novels and short stories. She was also the mother of writer Pablo Huneeus.

In the opinion of writer Virginia Vidal, she

She was a participant in the series of conferences organized by the Friends of the Book Association in 1977 at the  called "".

Works
 Desvelo impaciente (Ediciones Ercilla, 1951)
 Los muñecos no sangran (Zig-Zag, 1969; Ediciones Universitarias de Valparaíso, 1973)
 Dentro y fuera de mi maleta: andanzas por el mundo (Renacimiento, 1980)
 ¿Quién soy? (Agrupación Amigos del Libro, 1980)
 La antimadre (Aconcagua, 1982)
 Los muñecos no sangran (Cuatro Vientos, 1989)

References

1905 births
2002 deaths
Chilean women novelists
Chilean people of Basque descent
Chilean people of English descent
Chilean women journalists
Chilean women short story writers
20th-century Chilean women writers
20th-century Chilean novelists